= Cimaria vargasi =

Scientific classification
- Kingdom: Animalia
- Phylum: Mollusca
- Class: Gastropoda
- Family: Pyramidellidae
- Genus: Cimaria
- Species: C. vargasi

Binomial name
- Cimaria vargasi Høisæter, 2012

Species of gastropod

Cimaria vargasi is a species of sea snail, a marine gastropod mollusk in the family Pyramidellidae, the pyrams and their allies. This is the only species assigned to the genus Cimaria.

== Distribution ==
This species is mainly distributed throughout the Pacific Ocean off the coasts of Florida, New Jersey and New York.
