= Cimaria =

Scientific classification
- Kingdom: Animalia
- Phylum: Mollusca
- Class: Gastropoda
- Family: Pyramidellidae
- Genus: Cimaria; Høisæter, 2012

Genus of gastropods

Cimaria is a genus of sea snails, marine gastropod mollusks in the family Pyramidellidae, the pyrams and their allies.

== Species ==
There is only one species known to exist within the genus Cimaria, this includes the following:

- Cimaria vargasi Høisæter, 2012
